The Tornado outbreak of June 1881 was a tornado outbreak that occurred on June 11–12, 1881. It affected the West North Central States of the Midwestern United States and produced numerous strong tornadoes, killing at least 20 people, primarily in parts of Kansas and Missouri. One of the strongest tornadoes in the outbreak was an F4—possibly an F5—that hit near Hopkins, Missouri, in Nodaway County. In all, the outbreak killed at least 20 people and injured at least 141.

Confirmed tornadoes
The ratings for these tornadoes were done by tornado expert Thomas P. Grazulis and are not official ratings.

June 11

June 12

See also
 List of North American tornadoes and tornado outbreaks

References

Bibliography

J
J
J
J
J
Hopkins Tornado, 1881
1881 natural disasters in the United States
June 1881 events